Turner House or Turner Farm or variations may refer to:

Structures

United States
White-Turner-Sanford House, Huntsville, Alabama, listed on the National Register of Historic Places (NRHP)
Richardson-Turner House, Lexa, Arkansas, NRHP-listed
Turner House (Little Rock, Arkansas), NRHP-listed
Turner-Ledbetter House, Little Rock, Arkansas, NRHP-listed
Kate Turner House, Magnolia, Arkansas, NRHP-listed
Dr. Philip Turner House, Norwichtown, Connecticut, NRHP-listed
Charles E. Turner House, Columbus, Georgia, listed on the NRHP in Muscogee County, Georgia
Patterson-Turner Homeplace, Hartwell, Georgia, listed on the NRHP in Hart County, Georgia
Williamson-Maley-Turner Farm, Jefferson, Georgia, listed on the NRHP in Jackson County, Georgia
Phillips-Turner-Kelly House, Monticello, Georgia, listed on the NRHP in Jasper County, Georgia
Henry Gray Turner House, Quitman, Georgia, NRHP-listed
Walden-Turner House, Stockbridge, Georgia, listed on the NRHP in Henry County, Georgia
John G. Turner House, Richfield, Idaho, listed on the NRHP in Lincoln County, Idaho
McCairn-Turner House, Goodland, Indiana, NRHP-listed
Francis A. and Rose M. Turner House, Avoca, Iowa, NRHP-listed
Susie P. Turner Double House, Des Moines, Iowa, NRHP-listed
Fred G. Turner House, North English, Iowa, NRHP-listed
William Thomas Turner Barn, Gardner, Kansas, NRHP-listed
Judge Jim Turner House, Paintsville, Kentucky, listed on the NRHP in Johnson County, Kentucky
Squire Turner House, Richmond, Kentucky, listed on the NRHP in Madison County, Kentucky
Turner House (Richmond, Kentucky), listed on the NRHP in Madison County, Kentucky
Turner-Fitzpatrick House, Richmond, Kentucky, listed on the NRHP in Madison County, Kentucky
J.L. Turner and Son Building, Scottsville, Kentucky, NRHP-listed
S. F. Turner and Company Steam Flouring and Grist Mill, Springfield, Kentucky, listed on the NRHP in Washington County, Kentucky
Turner's Hall, New Orleans, Louisiana, listed on the NRHP in Orleans Parish, Louisiana
Turner Farm II, North Haven, Maine, NRHP-listed
Turner Farm Site, North Haven, Maine, NRHP-listed
Turner Town House, Turner, Maine, NRHP-listed
Turner Hill, Ipswich, Massachusetts, NRHP-listed
Stephen Turner House, Norfolk, Massachusetts, NRHP-listed
Turner House (Grand Rapids, Michigan), listed on the NRHP in Kent County, Michigan
Smith-Turner House, Lansing, Michigan, NRHP-listed
Turner-Dodge House, Lansing, Michigan, NRHP-listed
Gordon Cole and Kate D. Turner House, Faribault, Minnesota, listed on the NRHP in Rice County, Minnesota
Turner Hall (New Ulm, Minnesota), listed on the NRHP in Brown County, Minnesota
Turner-Pharr House, Clarksville, Missouri, NRHP-listed
George and Nancy Turner House, Fremont, Nebraska, listed on the NRHP in Dodge County, Nebraska
Turner–Chew–Carhart Farm, near Clinton, New Jersey, listed on the NRHP in Hunterdon County, New Jersey
Turner House (New York), a house designed by architect Fletcher Steele
Winslow-Turner Carriage House, Plattsburgh, New York, NRHP-listed
Neill-Turner-Lester House, Sherrills Ford, North Carolina, NRHP-listed
John T. and Mary Turner House, Raleigh, North Carolina, NRHP-listed
Henry Turner House and Caldwell-Turner Mill Site, Statesville, North Carolina, NRHP-listed
John E. Turner House, Holdenville, Oklahoma, NRHP-listed
Frederick Turner Fourplex, Portland, Oregon, listed on the NRHP in Northeast Portland, Oregon
R. Perry Turner House, Greer, South Carolina, NRHP-listed
Robert G. Turner House, Greer, South Carolina, NRHP-listed
Frank and Clara Turner House, Faulkton, South Dakota, NRHP-listed
Ida New and William Madison Turner Farm, Lebanon, Tennessee, NRHP-listed
Joe E. Turner House, Itasca, Texas, listed on the NRHP in Hill County, Texas
James Turner House, Marshall, Texas, NRHP-listed
Fred and Juliette Turner House, Midland, Texas, listed on the NRHP in Midland County, Texas
Turner-White-McGee House, Roganville, Texas, listed on the NRHP in Jasper County, Texas
Turner–LaRowe House, Charlottesville, Virginia, NRHP-listed
Old Turner Place, Henry, Virginia, NRHP-listed
Turner-Koepf House, Seattle, Washington, listed on the NRHP in King County, Washington
Luther P. and Jane Marie Turner House, Spokane, Washington, listed on the NRHP in Spokane County, Washington
Priscilla Strode Turner House, Beddington, West Virginia, NRHP-listed
Turner Hall (Milwaukee), a National Historic Landmark

United Kingdom
Turner House Gallery, an art gallery in Penarth, Wales
Turner House, London headquarters of Turner Broadcasting System Europe

Other uses
The Turner House, a 2015 novel by Angela Flounoy

See also
Turner Historic District, Cypert, Arkansas, NRHP-listed
Turner Hall (disambiguation)

Architectural disambiguation pages